Lectionary 1602, designated by ℓ 1602 in the Gregory-Aland numbering, 
is a Coptic–Greek bilingual manuscript of the New Testament, on parchment leaves, dated paleographically to the 8th century.

Description 
The text is written in Greek Uncial letters, on 88 parchment leaves (36.2 by 28.4 cm), in 2 columns per page, and 28 lines per page.

The codex contains Lessons from the four Gospels lectionary (Evangelistarium). 

It has two endings to the Gospel of Mark (as in codices Codex Regius Ψ 099 0112 274mg 579).

The codex is now located in the University of Michigan (P. Mich. Inv., Nr. 4942, 1 fol.) in Ann Arbor.

See also 
List of New Testament lectionaries
Coptic versions of the Bible
Textual criticism

References

External links 

Lectionary 1602 at the CSNTM

Greek New Testament lectionaries
Greek-Coptic diglot manuscripts of the New Testament
8th-century biblical manuscripts